Walt Disney Studios Motion Pictures (previously known as Buena Vista Pictures Distribution, Inc.) is an American film distribution studio within the Disney Entertainment division of The Walt Disney Company. It handles theatrical and occasional digital distribution, marketing and promotion for films produced and released by the Walt Disney Studios, including Walt Disney Pictures, Walt Disney Animation Studios, Pixar, Marvel Studios, Lucasfilm, and 20th Century Studios; the Searchlight Pictures label operates its own autonomous theatrical distribution and marketing unit.

The company was originally established by Walt Disney in 1953 as Buena Vista Film Distribution Company, Inc. (later renamed to Buena Vista Distribution Company, Inc. and Buena Vista Pictures Distribution, Inc.). It took on its current name in 2007.

History
Before 1953, Disney's productions were distributed by M.J. Winkler Pictures (1924–1926), Film Booking Offices of America (1926–1927), Universal Pictures (1927–1928), Celebrity Productions (1928–1930), Columbia Pictures (1930–1932), United Artists (1932–1937, 1943), and RKO Radio Pictures (1937–1956).

Buena Vista

A dispute in 1953 over the distribution of The Living Desert, Disney's first full-length film in the True-Life Adventures series, led Walt and his older brother Roy O. Disney to form its wholly owned subsidiary, the Buena Vista Film Distribution Company, Inc. (BVDC), to handle North American distribution of their own products. RKO refused to distribute the film. The name "Buena Vista" came from the street in Burbank, California, where the Disney Studios was located (and remains to this day). Buena Vista's first release was the Academy Award-winning live-action feature The Living Desert on November 10, 1953, along with Toot, Whistle, Plunk and Boom, Buena Vista's first animated release. Notable subsequent releases include the foreign films, Victoria in Dover, Princess Yang Kwei Fei (Most Noble Lady), released in US theaters in September 1956, The Missouri Traveler in March 1958, and The Big Fisherman in July 1959 (the first third-party production financed by Disney).

By July 5, 1957, RKO Japan, Ltd. was sold to Disney Productions and British Commonwealth Film Corporation. In allocating the foreign film licenses to the company, Disney would use 5 and Commonwealth 8.

In April 1960, the company dropped "Film" from its name. In 1961, Disney incorporated Buena Vista International (BVI), distributing its first PG-rated film, Take Down, in January 1979. The low-budget movie was not produced by the Disney studios and was acquired from an independent studio, making The Black Hole the first PG-rated Disney film. In July 1987, Buena Vista changed its name to Buena Vista Pictures Distribution, Inc. (BVPD).

Late in the 1980s, Disney purchased a controlling stake in one of Pacific Theatres' chains leading to Disney's Buena Vista Theaters and Pacific to renovate the El Capitan Theatre and the Crest by 1989. The Crest was finished first while El Capitan opened with the premiere of The Rocketeer film on June 19, 1991.

In 1992, Buena Vista made production loans totaling $5.6 million to Cinergi Pictures for its film Medicine Man and its 1994 films Renaissance Man and Color of Night and were distributing Cinergi's films. The corporation purchased a 12.8% share in Cinergi with its initial public offering in 1994. Soon, BVPD signed a 25 picture distribution deal with Cinergi.

The Gaumont Film Company and Disney formed Gaumont Buena Vista International, a joint venture in French distribution, in 1993. In August 1996, Disney and Tokuma Shoten Publishing agreed that Disney would distribute Studio Ghibli animated films and provide 10% of the production cost of the studio's current in-production film, Spirited Away. Disney would go on to produce the English dubs and distribute 15 of Ghibli's films, through the Walt Disney Pictures, Buena Vista Home Video, Miramax and Touchstone Pictures banners.

In September 1996, following Disney's acquisition of Capital Cities/ABC, Buena Vista Pictures Distribution, Inc. was merged into ABC, Inc., the parent company of that group.

For the November 1995 premiere of Toy Story, Disney rented the Hollywood Masonic Temple—adjacent to the El Capitan Theatre—for Totally Toy Story, a multimedia funhouse and a promotional event for the movie. On July 17, 1998, Buena Vista Pictures Distribution purchased the Hollywood Masonic Temple building to continue using it as a promotional venue.

By 1997, BVPD's share in Cinergi dropped to 5%. After nine films were delivered under the agreement, Cinergi sold Disney on November 22, 1997, all of its 12-film library except for Die Hard with a Vengeance plus $20 million in exchange for Disney's Cinergi share holdings, production advances of $35.4 million and other loans. In 2002, Disney signed a four animated film deal with Vanguard Animation; however, only one film was released under that negotiation.

In 2004, BVI and Gaumont dissolved their French distribution joint venture, Gaumont Buena Vista International. Buena Vista International agreed to a distribution deal with MegaStar Joint Venture Company Limited in April 2006 for the Vietnam market.

Walt Disney Studios Motion Pictures
On April 25, 2007, Disney discontinued the usage of the Buena Vista brand in its distribution branding.

In 2009, Disney entered a distribution agreement with a reorganized DreamWorks; the deal called for an estimated 30 films over a five-year period from DreamWorks and they would be released through the Touchstone Pictures label. In 2011, GKIDS acquired the North American theatrical distribution rights of the Ghibli films, with Walt Disney Studios Home Entertainment retaining the home video rights until July 2017. However, Disney only handles home video distribution of the company's films in Japan, Taiwan and China.

Disney's distribution deal with DreamWorks expired in August 2016, after the two studios decided to not renew their agreement on December 16, 2015, with Universal Pictures replacing Disney as DreamWorks' distributor. By the end of the deal, Disney had distributed 14 of DreamWorks's original 30-picture agreement; thirteen through Touchstone and one through Walt Disney Pictures. Disney took complete ownership rights of those 14 DreamWorks films from Amblin Partners in exchange for loans made to that company. The Light Between Oceans, the final film in that distribution deal, was also the last film released under the Touchstone banner.

On December 14, 2017, The Walt Disney Company announced plans to purchase 21st Century Fox, which included 20th Century Fox and Fox Searchlight Pictures. On March 20, 2019, the acquisition of 21st Century Fox was completed. Following the reorganization and renaming of the acquired film units, Walt Disney Studios Motion Pictures began distributing 20th Century Studios films, while Searchlight Pictures continued to operate their autonomous distribution unit.

In late 2020 and early 2021, Disney reorganized the studio, placing it under the Disney Media and Entertainment Distribution unit which also oversees distribution to Disney+.  Under this structure, the Theatrical Distribution unit oversaw the domestic and international films produced by all the studios within the Walt Disney Studios umbrella. In February 2023, returning CEO Bob Iger reversed this decision and reorganized the studio again, returning it as a divsion under the purview of The Walt Disney Studios.

Distribution

Walt Disney Studios has produced or distributed 35 films that have received nominations for the Academy Award for Best Picture: fifteen from its former Miramax division, six from Touchstone Pictures, four from both Walt Disney Pictures and Searchlight Pictures, three from 20th Century Studios, two from Hollywood Pictures, and one from Marvel Studios. Of those nominated films, five films—The English Patient, Shakespeare in Love, Chicago, No Country for Old Men, and Nomadland—have won Best Picture.

Walt Disney Studios Motion Pictures currently distributes films from across all units of Walt Disney Studios with the exception of Searchlight Pictures, which maintains its own autonomous distribution and marketing operations. Other Disney film units and some third-party studios including:

International distribution

Walt Disney Studios Motion Pictures International was formed in 1961 as Buena Vista International. On May 4, 1987, despite being industry rivals, Disney signed a theatrical distribution agreement with Warner Bros. International for the release of Disney and Touchstone films in many overseas markets except in Australia and New Zealand, where distribution went through Roadshow Distributors instead, with Disney retaining full control of all distribution and marketing decisions on their product (one notable practice in this policy is obscuring Warner references in posters and it is credited only in very small text with the exception of some UK posters where sometimes the full logo is shown). Warner previously had an overseas distribution partnership with Columbia Pictures, but it was dissolved in 1988.

In 1992, Disney opted to end their joint venture with Warner Bros. to start autonomously distributing their films in these aforementioned overseas markets beginning with Aladdin and at the same period, Warner Bros. established the Family Entertainment label to self-distribute family-friendly films under the Warner umbrella. In those territories from 1993 to 2007, Disney reactivated the Buena Vista International name, and also sent distribution under it in countries that did not have any current arrangements with other companies.. Disney would then continue its overseas film distribution relationship with Warner Bros. through a home video distribution deal in Europe and Australia in which Warner Home Video distributed select Disney material on DVD from 1999 to 2002, when Disney opted to self-distribute DVDs in these aforementioned territories.

Italia Film, a Lebanese film distribution and production company, is Disney's exclusive theatrical film distribution partner for various Middle East and North Africa (MENA) markets since 1993, after making a deal directly with Buena Vista International at the time. Prior to this, Warner Bros. originally handled said MENA markets except in Israel where Buena Vista handled theatrical distribution by themselves.

In Taiwan, MGM first handled Disney's distribution, with 20th Century Fox and Warner Bros. later taking over. A local distributor called Era Communications took over distribution from 1992 to 1995. At that time, Buena Vista began its Taiwanese operations. Columbia ended its joint distribution unit with Fox and switched to Buena Vista in 1999.

Rights to Disney's films in West Germany were originally released by MGM (under CIC in the early 1970s) and later to 20th Century Fox, and then to United International Pictures' German division before the Warner Bros. joint venture. In September 2004, Buena Vista International Germany announced they would begin to start theatrically distributing certain films from Universum Film (mainly family-friendly releases) beginning in February 2005, replacing a previous deal with United International Pictures. The deal ended after Universum was sold by the RTL Group to Tele München Group, who began to self-distribute releases afterwards under the Leonine Distribution name.

In Spain, Filmayer S.A. originally released Disney's movies, with Warner Española S.A. later taking over.

In the United Kingdom, Disney's movies were released through Rank Film Distributors under the UK Film Distributors Ltd. name before the Warner Bros. joint venture.

In Italy and Brazil, Disney's movies were distributed by Cinema International Corporation and United International Pictures before the Warner Bros. joint venture.

In Australia and New Zealand, Disney's movies were distributed by 20th Century Fox under its joint ventures with CIC and UIP (named CIC-Fox and UIP-Fox respectively) before distribution switched to Greater Union Film Distributors until the latter merged with Village Roadshow in 1987 and Roadshow Entertainment took over distribution.

In some other countries in Europe, such as Poland, Hungary and the Czech Republic, Disney's movies were instead released through local distributors, such as Filmoteka Narodowa in Poland, InterCom Zrt. in Hungary and Guild Film Distribution in the Czech Republic respectively.

Disney and Sony Pictures formed in 1997 a film distribution joint venture in Southeast Asia. By December 2006, 14 joint distribution ventures with Sony Pictures Releasing International were formed and exist in countries including Brazil, Mexico, Singapore, Thailand and the Philippines. In January 2007, their fifteenth such partnership began operations in Russia and CIS. In February 2017, Sony starting leaving the Southeast Asia venture with the Philippines. On August 14, 2017, Sony terminated the joint venture agreement for their own operations. On January 31, 2019, in anticipation of the then-pending acquisition of the most 21st Century Fox assets (which includes 20th Century Fox), Disney agreed to sell its stake in the Mexican joint venture named Walt Disney Studios Sony Pictures Releasing de México to Sony Pictures Releasing.

In Greece and Cyprus, Disney's movies are distributed through local distributor Feelgood Entertainment, which also distributes Sony Pictures films in those territories.

In Japan, in order to adapt Japan's theatrical and home media distribution model, Walt Disney Studios Motion Pictures Japan and Walt Disney Studios Home Entertainment Japan were merged as Walt Disney Studios Japan on March 1, 2010, the distribution unit was renamed to Walt Disney Japan on November 22, 2016.

In China, due to its regulated policies on international film distribution, all of Disney's films in China are distributed by China Film Co., Ltd. and/or Huaxia Film Distribution, but Disney can still all promotion rights of their films unless it sold to third-party companies.

Disney distributed the 2008 Indian tamil film Dasavathaaram in Canada under the Buena Vista International banner.

The Australian-produced film Subdivision was released in the Australian and New Zealand theaters on August 20, 2009, by Walt Disney Studios Motion Pictures under the Buena Vista International label in Australia with Lightning Entertainment handling the international distribution.

On October 3, 2017, it was announced that Disney would be handling international distribution of M. Night Shyamalan's Glass, released in early 2019, through the Buena Vista International banner. The film is a sequel to his earlier films Unbreakable (distributed by Disney through Touchstone) and Split (distributed by Universal Pictures). Through an arrangement made with Disney, Universal retained domestic rights to the film, while Disney distributed in international territories under the label. The UK-produced film Patrick was also released in 2018 by Disney under the Buena Vista International label in the UK. Missing Link was also released by Disney under Buena Vista International in Latin America, Russia and some countries in Asia.

On February 11, 2022, the Latin American branch of Buena Vista International was renamed to Star Distribution, as the Star branding replaced the Buena Vista brand in the Latin American region by Disney Latin America.

On November 3, 2022, the Brazilian branch of Buena Vista International was also renamed to Star Distribution following the Buena Vista brand was officially dropped in the Latin American region on February 11, 2022, to be replaced by Star brand. However, the Buena Vista International name is still used on Latin American and Brazilian prints of 20th Century/Searchlight titles.

Film library

Highest-grossing films
Walt Disney Studios Motion Pictures has released the most films that have crossed the $1 billion mark (twenty-six, in worldwide grosses among major Hollywood studios), with thirteen of the twenty highest-grossing films of all time being distributed by Disney; including the highest-grossing film in North America (Star Wars: The Force Awakens)  Of those thirteen films, four of them have crossed the $2 billion mark in worldwide grosses, the most for any studio. Disney has directly distributed three of the top five highest-grossing films in history (Avengers: Endgame, Avatar: The Way of Water, and Star Wars: The Force Awakens) and owns the rights to the other two films (Avatar and Titanic).

In addition, Disney is the first of only three studios that have released at least two billion-dollar films in the same year (the others being Warner Bros. and Universal Pictures). Furthermore, Disney is the only studio that has achieved this seven times, in 2010, 2013, 2015, 2016, 2017, 2018, and 2019. 2016 included four $1 billion releases, and 2019 included seven $1 billion releases, both records for any studio. Eight of the top ten highest-grossing animated films have been released by Disney, as well as sixteen of the twenty highest-grossing G-rated films. In addition, four of the top five opening weekends were Disney releases. In 2015, Disney achieved its largest yearly box-office gross worldwide and in North America. In 2016, Disney surpassed $7 billion in worldwide yearly box-office gross—the first of any major studio—surpassing the previous 2015 record. In 2019, Disney became the first studio ever to have seven releases cross $1 billion each in a single year. In the same year, Disney broke the previous records by making an unprecedented $13.2 billion at the global box office.
 

‡—Includes theatrical reissue(s)

Notes

References

External links
 Walt Disney Pictures

Walt Disney Studios (division)
Film distributors of the United States
Film production companies of the United States
Entertainment companies based in California
Companies based in Burbank, California
American companies established in 1953
Entertainment companies established in 1953
Mass media companies established in 1953
1953 establishments in California